Luciano Alfieri (born 30 March 1936) is an Italian footballer. He competed in the men's tournament at the 1960 Summer Olympics.

References

External links
 

1936 births
Living people
Italian footballers
Olympic footballers of Italy
Footballers at the 1960 Summer Olympics
Footballers from Milan
Association football goalkeepers